The United Socialist Workers' Party (PSTU) is a Trotskyist party in Brazil. It is the largest section of the International Workers' League (Fourth International) (LIT), an international body of groups in the Morenoist tradition.

History

Early history
The origins of the PSTU can be traced to 1972 when a number of Brazilian militants from a variety of political backgrounds contacted the reunified Fourth International (FI). These militants formed the Starting Point group in Salvador Allende's Chile, only to find themselves dispersed in 1973 when Allende's government was overthrown. Some members of Turning Point fled to Argentina and founded the Workers League.

Returning to Brazil in 1974, the Workers League commenced publication of the magazine Workers Independence and recruited new members from within the student movement. By 1977 the group had grown to 300 members. At that point, Nahuel Moreno of the Argentinian Socialist Workers Party (PST) organised the Bolshevik Faction within the FI, to which the Workers League adhered.

In 1978 the Workers League formed the Movimento Convergência Socialista (CS) as part of a tactic aimed at the establishment of a new mass socialist party. The Workers League also renamed itself the Socialist Workers Party (PST). Later in the year a number of members were jailed, alongside them Nahuel Moreno. An international campaign for their release won the support of Gabriel García Márquez.

By 1979 CS was part of a growing campaign for a new Workers' Party and played an important role in the metal working strikes that took place in the ABC region that year. In January the PST fully integrated itself into the CS ending its separate organisational form. The following year again saw CS taking a role in the important 40-day strike in the ABC region. Its own growth was marked by the attendance of 3,000 people at a rally of the CS and Moreno's international tendency, then linked to Pierre Lambert's France-based tendency.  By 1982 Moreno and Lambert had parted company and the former organised the International Workers' League (Fourth International) to which CS affiliated.

In the early 1980s, CS took part in the founding of the Central Unica dos Trabalhadores (CUT) union centre as strikes spread through Brazil along with other forms of social unrest. They were also to form part of the Workers' Party when it was founded in 1980 and recognised officially by the state in 1982. As an officially recognised platform or faction of the PT, the CS saw a number of its members elected to national, state and local legislative bodies during the 1980s.

Recent history
The affiliation of CS with the PT was not to last and by late 1991 the leadership of the latter was concerned at the activities of some PT factions particularly CS. This situation arose due to the involvement of CS in extra-parliamentary struggles and deepened in 1992 as the CS campaigned against the government of Fernando Collor de Mello and the International Monetary Fund. The situation continued to deteriorate and in June CS was expelled from PT. In response the CS formed the Revolutionary Front which at a Congress in April 1993 became the PSTU with the fusion of CS into the new party alongside a number of smaller groups including Democracia Operária (RS), the PFS, MSR (PE), Liga and the CS. 21 of April Movement.

Since then the PSTU has continued as a persistent presence in the Brazilian labour and social movements to the left of the PT. It has lost a number of members in splits, most recently to the newly formed PSOL, which it refused to become a part of. It contests national and local elections and is involved in social movements, particularly the labor movement and student movement. The PSTU publishes the weekly newspaper Opinião Socialista (Socialist Opinion) and is the main group contributing to the journal Marxism Alive/Marxismo Vivo.

The PSTU is the Brazilian section of the International Workers League – Fourth International (Lit) with which the Italian Progetto Comunista - Rifondare l'Opposizione dei Lavoratori (PC-ROL) has for a long time had a close political relationship and mutual collaboration. The PSTU is also the main force of the Brazilian extreme left and first took part in elections in the Third Pole that supported the candidacy of Heloísa Helena Lima de Moraes Carvalho, former member of the PT (the party of Luiz Inácio Lula da Silva) expelled from the PT with others for her opposition to the reform of pensions (in 2008 she became leader of the Socialism and Liberty Party with Ivan Valente and Luciana Genro).

In the 2010 presidential election, the PSTU candidate received 0.08% of votes (88,000).

Electoral history

Presidential election

Legislative elections

References

1993 establishments in Brazil
Communist parties in Brazil
Far-left political parties
Far-left politics in Brazil
International Workers League – Fourth International
Political parties established in 1993
Political parties in Brazil
Trotskyist organisations in Brazil
Left-wing politics in Brazil
Left-wing parties